Alamein railway station is the terminus of the suburban electrified Alamein line in Victoria, Australia. It serves the eastern Melbourne suburb of Ashburton, and it opened on 28 June 1948.

History

Alamein station opened on 28 June 1948, and was the last station to be built on what is now the line of the same name. It opened on the reservation of the former Outer Circle line. The section on which Alamein is now located was closed to all traffic in 1895.

The station served a new Housing Commission estate that had been constructed for people who were displaced after World War II. The station still bears the name of the estate, which in turn had been named after the World War II battlefield in North Africa. It opened without much fanfare; there was no official ceremony from the Victorian Railways, local politicians or local councillors. Only 103 tickets were sold up to 10:30 a.m. on the first day of operations.

The Outer Circle Trail for cyclists and walkers continues along the Outer Circle alignment after Alamein as far as Gardiners Creek and the Malvern Valley Public Golf Course. It then connects with the Gardiners Creek Trail and a path to East Malvern.

During the 2011/2012 financial year, it was the 8th least used station on Melbourne's metropolitan network, with 153,000 passenger movements.

Platforms and services

Alamein has one platform. It is serviced by Metro Trains' Alamein line services.

Platform 1:
  weekday all stations and limited express services to Flinders Street; all stations shuttle services to Camberwell

References

External links
 
 Melway map at street-directory.com.au

Railway stations in Melbourne
Railway stations in Australia opened in 1948
Railway stations in the City of Boroondara